Discovery World is a science and technology museum in Milwaukee, Wisconsin. The museum is dedicated to inspiring the next generation of STEM majors through curiosity and creativity.

Focus

Mission 
"Discovery World is an extraordinary experience devoted to sharing the wonders of science and igniting a love of endless exploration. We are the spark of joy in a child’s eyes when they make a connection with a living creature. We are the sudden and satisfying “Aha” when you discover something you didn’t even know you were looking for. We are the beginning of your lifelong learning adventure."Discovery World focuses on innovation and technology, as well as Great Lakes education and conservation. It contains interactive exhibits, the Reiman Aquarium, a theater, and multiple event spaces.  Many of the exhibits include hands-on elements with themes based on science all around us and water conservation. The entire Great Lakes watershed, built to scale in the Great Lakes Future Exhibit, addresses freshwater issues, stewardship, and the human relationship with freshwater resources.

History 
Founded by Robert Powrie Harland, Sr., Discovery World was initially known as the Science, Economics and Technology Center. Plans for it appeared in the Milwaukee Journal in 1981. The museum's early location was the Milwaukee Public Library, inside the Wisconsin Ave. entrance of the library. The museum featured hands-on exhibits, computerized simulations, and science shows.

Leadership
CEO: Brian Wunar

Exhibits 

Discovery World contains numerous interactive science, technology, and freshwater exhibits in its 120,000-foot facility. These exhibits include the following:

Great Lakes Future 
A model of the entire Great Lakes watershed built to scale addresses freshwater issues, stewardship, and the relationship between humans and freshwater resources. It also features an artificially induced weather event. With the push of a button, visitors can call for "rain" to fall down upon this watershed, observing where the water flows and how run-off pollutants navigate the region. The perimeter of the exhibit features several tank habitats. Inhabitants include an Alligator Snapping Turtle, Tiger Salamanders, a Northern Spiny Softshell Turtle, an Ornate Box Turtle, a Three-Toed Box Turtle, a Blanding's Turtle, a Red-eared Slider, North American Wood Turtles, a Corn Snake, a Bull Snake, Pumpkinseed, and Bluegill. Several ice-age and prehistoric animal skulls are found throughout the exhibit as well.

Reiman Aquarium 
The Reiman Aquarium occupies the lower level of Discovery World. Tank exhibits replicate a wide variety of aquatic habitats, including that of Lake Michigan, Amazon Basin rivers, the Pacific and Atlantic Oceans, the Caribbean Sea, and the African Great Lakes.

Lake Michigan Tank

The Lake Michigan tanks is a 75,000-gallon cold freshwater tank in the center of the aquarium. Dozens of other tanks follow a path around the exhibit. This tank is home to Lake and Shovelnose Sturgeon, Largemouth Bass, White and Black Crappie, Paddlefish, Northern Pike, Walleye, Freshwater Drums, Bowfin, Spotted, Longnose, and Shortnose Gar, Bigmouth and Smallmouth Buffalo, Channel Catfish, White Bass, and Common Carp, all of which are native to the Great Lakes. Aquarists and interns conduct one cleaning dive a week to manually scrub algae and feed the fish.

"L" Tanks

The aquarists call these the "L" tanks due to their unconventional shape. These tanks occupy two levels, while tank glass penetrates the floor between these levels. This allows visitors to watch tank inhabitants swim beneath their feet.

 Great Lakes Comp Tank
 This is essentially a smaller, less diverse version of the Lake Michigan tank. This first of the two "L" tanks features Bluegill, Black Crappie, and Smallmouth Bass.
 North Atlantic Tank
 This North-Atlantic-simulating tank holds cold saltwater. This second "L" tank feature Striped Bass, Snowy Grouper, and Summer Flounder.
Amazon Basin River Tank

The freshwater Amazon Basin River system tank features a Silver Arowana, Bigtooth River Stingray, Blood Red Parrotfish, Black Ghost Knifefish, Jurupari, Marbled Angelfish and Motoro/Leopoldi hybrid Stingray. This large tank is placed in a corner from which an apron of glass extends out through the floor, allowing visitors to walk over and view tank inhabitants beneath their feet.

Caribbean Tank

This 65,000-gallon warm saltwater tank is the most colorful and active tank and is displayed via an upside down halfpipe design, which visitors can walk through. This tank is home to a Rooster Hogfish, a Sargassum Triggerfish, two Bamboo Sharks, Goatfish, French and Queen Angelfish, a Cownose Stingray, and a variety of Grunts, a Scrawled Filefish.

Here, aquarists and interns also conduct one cleaning dive a week to scrub algae. 
Touch Tanks

There are two touch tanks where visitors can have a hands-on interaction with some aquatic creatures.

A cold freshwater touch tank features young Lake Sturgeon who, when large enough, will be relocated to the larger Lake Michigan tank to join a larger, more diverse environment more appropriate for an adult sturgeon.

A much warmer saltwater touch tank features Atlantic Stingray and Cortez Round Stringray. Under employee supervision, children and other visitors can learn how to responsibly interact with aquatic life.

Weird and Wild

The final hallway of the aquarium features several tanks with a handful of unique organisms. These include a South American tank, home to a Black Ghost Knifefish; an interesting relative to the Electric Eel which, too, can generate its own electric field. This is used to navigate its environment. A terrarium features several Blue Poison Dart frogs. In captivity, these frogs are not poisonous as they acquire their poison through bioaccumulation within their ecosystem. Another tank is home to the tiny freshwater Pea Pufferfish. To follow is a Piranha tank, an Axolotl tank, Cichlid tank, and Amazon tank. Finally is the tank holding a West African Lungfish, a primitive fish belonging to the lobe-finned fish class Sarcopterygii. In addition to having fleshy, boned appendages, lungfish also have a modified air bladder used to gasp surface air, a useful trait when considering their native oxygen-deprived waters.

Les Paul’s House of Sound 
This interactive experience showcases the innovative and creative spirit of the legendary musician Les Paul. The exhibit allows visitors to travel along Paul's timeline to see his beginnings in Wisconsin to his travels around the world. Les Paul's House of Sound features three different areas: Les's Early Years, The Musician on the Road to Stardom, and Friends of Les Paul. The exhibit includes Paul’s Grammy Awards, the first Gibson guitar Paul produced, and the "Klunker" he used to produce top ten hits.

Helen Bader Foundation's Great Lakes Future 
This large interactive model of the Great Lakes features flora and fauna that populate the Great Lakes, an interactive hydrologic cycle that allows visitors to control the weather, and a Sky Bridge that offers the opportunity to see the Great Lakes in a whole new way. The permanent exhibit was designed by Grace La and James Dallman of LA DALLMAN and was published in the Berlin monograph 1000x Architecture of the Americas.

City of Freshwater & Badger Meter Liquid House 
This exhibit explains how the water used in homes eventually flows back to Lake Michigan. Other features of this exhibit include a look into Milwaukee Metropolitan Sewerage District processes, Milwaukee Water Works, and Milwaukee’s Deep Tunnel project, which reduces the amount of wastewater dumped into Lake Michigan each year. The permanent exhibit, comprising more than twenty interactive installations, was designed by Grace La and James Dallman of LA DALLMAN.

Rockwell Automation Dream Machine 
This exhibit allows the public to design products to take home, experience a custom-built automated factory, and learn modern engineering trends. Visitors can operate the controls of the retractable domes of Miller Park and the Milwaukee Art Museum.

Other Exhibits 
Other exhibits at Discovery World include The Challenge (an 88 ft replica of a 19th century schooner), Simple Machine Shipyard, Driving and Flight Simulators, All Aboard, Milwaukee Muscle, Power On, Physics and You & The Innovation Station, Virtual Explorer, Clean Air Trek, BIG, and The Distant Mirror.

Experiences 
Discovery World also offers:

 Kohl’s Design It! Lab is a weekend experience that turns the Kohl’s Design It! Lab into a café that serves a full menu of projects such as laser-cut cardboard houses or apparel made with repurposed materials.
 Wind Leaves is a permanent group of sculptures in front of Discovery World. It consists of seven tall "leaves" coated in stainless steel disks that reflect the surroundings and react to wind. They are interactive and can be spun by visitors.

Labs and studios 
Discovery World has 10 labs and studios that allow visitors to become involved with innovation, creativity, science, technology and the environment, especially with freshwater resources and the Great Lakes. The 10 labs and studios are made up of:
  
 Biology Lab allows the public to explore everything from microscopic organisms to understanding how to measure different substances and materials using professional laboratory tools.
 Kohl’s Design It! Lab is a space that exposes visitors to industry professionals, equipment, industrial design, and the economic opportunities within the realms of sustainability, design, and beauty. The lab explores the science of the human body and examines cultures by discovering how artifacts are made, through hands-on design projects.
 Print & Publishing Lab is a space that focuses on the physical applications of graphic design and digital artwork that can be applied to the business and art world. Through customized classes and workshops, designers and entrepreneurs gain access to pro-level software and screen printing equipment. Visitors also gain the skills to turn their designs into physical products that can be used in the marketplace.
 MillerCoors THIRST Lab is a space designed to teach visitors how to understand water as a resource, as an ingredient, and as an opportunity. By examining the production process in the THIRST Lab, participants become aware of water’s role in the creation of products.  
 General Science Lab provides more space and tools for the public to engage in designing the future. The lab is home to programs and experiences having to do with archaeology, physics, chemistry, and computer drafting and design.
 Electronics Lab gives visitors a place to tinker. Participants can explore circuitry, robotics, mechanical design, and relationships to the natural world.  
 Digital Arts Lab teaches how to develop original ideas and creative skills in the areas of visual art, digital literacy, audio and writing. Professional software and WACOM drawing tablets are key tools that students use in developing original, quality work.  
 Video Studio helps people develop presentation and digital literacy skills. The studio is also a production space for photography, live performance, and professional rentals.
 Audio Studio is a professional environment designed for creating high quality music and voice recordings for podcasts. Using high-end digital and analog equipment in three isolation booths, the Discovery World staff guides visitors through the process of capturing and working with sound for a variety of projects.

Funding 
Discovery World is a 501 (c)(3) non-profit organization that does not receive any public funding. The organization has received significant donations from area corporations, including $2.5 million from Rockwell Automation in October 2014, and $2 million from Kohl's in January 2016.

References

External links 
Discovery World website

Children's museums in Wisconsin
Museums in Milwaukee
Science museums in Wisconsin
Maritime museums in Wisconsin